František Mikloško (born 2 June 1947) is a Slovak politician. He was the Speaker of the Slovak National Council from 1990 to 1992. And a long serving MP of the National Council of the Slovak Republic (1990-2010). For most of his career, he was a member of Christian Democratic Movement.

Early life 
Mikloško studied Mathematics at the Comenius University, graduating in 1966. Already as a student, he was active in the activities of the Catholic Church, which had a complicated relationship with the Communist regime at the time. At first, Mikloško's activities were limited to low profile organization of small student gatherings while working as a researcher at the Slovak Academy of Sciences. However, since 1980s, Mikloško started gradually to contribute to organization of large religious pilgrimages, which has attracted the attention of the Communist regime.  In 1983 he was fired from the Academy and could only work in  manual occupations. In spite of the regime repression, Mikloško continued to organize increasingly anti-regime rallied, most prominently the Candle demonstration in Bratislava in 1988. After the Velvet Revolution, he became the first Speaker of the Slovak National Council.

Political Career 
Mikloško was  Mikloško was one of the longest-serving members of parliament in Slovakia. He was also a candidate in the 2004 presidential election and the 2009 presidential election. Mikloško did not participated in 2010 parliament election and retired from politics.

On 12 March 2008 František Mikloško, together with Vladimír Palko, Pavol Minárik, and Rudolf Bauer, established a new party called Conservative Democrats of Slovakia which was dissolved in 2014.

References 

1947 births
Living people
Politicians from Nitra
Christian Democratic Movement politicians
Conservative Democrats of Slovakia politicians
Comenius University alumni
Candidates for President of Slovakia
Slovak mathematicians
Members of the National Council (Slovakia) 1992-1994
Members of the National Council (Slovakia) 1994-1998
Members of the National Council (Slovakia) 1998-2002
Members of the National Council (Slovakia) 2002-2006
Members of the National Council (Slovakia) 2006-2010